Siba State, was a small independent Indian hill state in the Lower Himalayas. It was centered on the town of Dadasiba, Pragpur tehsil, Kangra district, in modern-day Himachal Pradesh. The state was founded in 1450. In 1849 the territory of Datarpur was added to Siba Jagir (1/3 part of land of Mian Devi Singh) and annexed by the British Raj as 'Dada-Siba'.

History

Siba State was founded by Raja Sibarna Chand, a younger brother of the Raja of Guler State about 1450. The state was seized by Guler State in 1808. In 1813 it was untouched by Maharaja Ranjit Singh, founder of the Sikh Empire of Pañjab (Punjab), although divided into two, one part was left for Raja Govind Singh as Princely state for his sustenance and the second one third part was left for Mian Devi Singh, cousin of Raja Gobind Singh. One third part of Mian Devi Singh was annexed by the British in 1849. Rest remained  with Raja Ram Singh.

Rulers
The rulers of Siba State had the title Raja.

.... - ....                Jaswant Chand            
.... - ....                Bhag Singh
.... - 1750                Lakel Singh
1750 - 1770                Madho Singh                        (d. 1770)
1770 - 1800                Sher Singh                         (d. 1800)
1800 - 1803                Govind Singh (1st time)            (d. 1845)
1803 - 1830               semi occupied by Guler
1830 - 1845                Govind Singh (2nd time)            (s.a.)
1845 - 1849                Ram Singh                          (d. 1875)
1849 -                     Sunder Singh                       (migrated to Tantpalan)
                           Birbal Singh
1900-1935                  Duni Chand
1935-                      Nama Singh

See also
List of Rajput dynasties
Guler State

References

External links

Princely states of India
History of Himachal Pradesh
Kangra district
Rajputs